This is a list of justices who have served or are currently serving on the Wisconsin Supreme Court.

Territorial judges

Circuit justices serving as Supreme Court justices
Initially, Wisconsin's Supreme Court was just composed of the five judges of the five state judicial circuits.  A sixth circuit was added in 1850.

Justices since 1853
In 1853, a separate Wisconsin Supreme Court was created with all members elected state-wide.  Initially the court was three members.  It grew to five justices in 1878, and to its current size of seven seats in 1907.

Sources
Trina E. Gray, Karen Leone de Nie, Jennifer Miller, and Amanda K. Todd, Portraits of Justice: The Wisconsin Supreme Court's First 150 Years, Second Edition (Wisconsin Historical Society Press, 2003).

Supreme Court Justices
 
Wisconsin